David Sieck (born June 27, 1957) is a member of the Iowa House of Representatives.  Sieck, a farmer and Republican from Glenwood, Iowa, won a special election in February 2015 to fill the seat being vacated by Mark Costello, who was elected to the Iowa Senate to fill the seat formerly held by Joni Ernst. Sieck was born and raised in Council Bluffs, Iowa.

References

1957 births
Living people
Republican Party members of the Iowa House of Representatives
21st-century American politicians
Politicians from Council Bluffs, Iowa
People from Glenwood, Iowa